Thomas Buckland Jeffery (5 February 1845 – 2 April 1910) was a British emigrant to the United states who co-founded the Gormully & Jeffery company which made the Rambler bicycle. He invented the "clincher" rim which was widely used to fit tires to bicycles and early automobiles, and in 1900 established the Thomas B. Jeffery Company to make automobiles, again using Rambler branding.

Early life 
Jeffery was born on 5 February 1845 at 3 Mill Pleasant in Stoke Damerel, Devon, England to Thomas Hellier and Elizabeth (Buckland) Jeffery.  At sixteen years of age he was working as a "mathematical instrument maker." 

At eighteen years of age, he emigrated to the United States and became a resident of Chicago, where "he was connected with the business of manufacturing telescopes." Later he was engaged in making models for the patent office.

Bicycle manufacturer 
In 1879 Jefferey, together with R. Philip Gormully, started the Gormully & Jeffery Manufacturing Company and began making the Rambler bicycle.·  

Jeffery was an inventor and bicycle manufacturer with his partner, R. Philip Gormully, who built and sold Rambler bicycles through his company, Gormully & Jeffery Mfg. Co., in Chicago from 1878 to 1900. The Rambler was still a proud piece of machinery when low prices took precedence over high quality. Its body featured flared metal tubing for extra strength at the joints, which were brazed by immersion in molten brass. These techniques continued even after Gormully & Jeffery and Rambler became names of the American Bicycle Company, or Bicycle Trust, which was not known for the best manufacturing techniques in all of its lines.

By 1900, Gormully & Jeffery was the country's second-largest bicycle maker and Jeffery had gained fame for developing, among other things, the clincher rim that enabled pneumatic tires to be used. Jeffery and Gormully were pioneers in the field.

Invention of the clincher rim 
Dunlop's original pneumatic tires were wrapped onto the rim, making them hard to service. The challenge was securely fastening the tire to the rim, while also allowing it to be easily removed for service. This was an era where horseshoe nails and other sharp debris was common on roads and tires typically had to be repaired every 100 miles.

From 1889 to 1895 a slew of patents were filed with various different methods of fastening tires to rims. Jeffery came up with an improved tire, held on the rim by hard rubber flanges that locked into channels in the rim. This came to be known as the "Clincher" tire. Jeffery received a patent on the ancestor of all clincher tires in 1892 (US Patent 466,789). From 1900 to about 1913, clinchers (which are still used on some bicycles) were the most common form of tires used on U.S. automobiles.

William Erskine Bartlett patented a similar clincher technology in Great Britain and the respective patents prevented British companies from manufacturing in the U.S. and vice versa. in 1903 G&J formed The Clincher Tire Manufacturer's Association to license use of their patent to tire companies, and the snubbing by CTMA of newcomers Goodyear and Firestone led these companies to develop the "straight-side" tire, which is the basis of all modern automobile tires. The ancestor of the straight side tire was invented by Charles Kingston Welch in 1890. In 1906, CTMA lost a patent infringement suit over the G&J patent, opening the U.S. market to other manufacturers of clincher tires. In 1917, CTMA changed its name to the Tire and Rim Association and that organization still publishes an annual Year Book containing tire and wheel standards.

Automobile manufacturer 

Jeffrey was one of America's first men interested in automobiles, and in 1897 he built the first Rambler motor car.

Around 1900 he sold his stake in G&J and founded the Thomas B. Jeffery Company. He used the G&J money to buy the Sterling Bicycle Co. factory in Kenosha, Wisconsin, where he set up shop to manufacture automobiles on a large scale. From 1902 until 1908, Jeffery moved steadily to bigger, more reliable models. His cars were built on assembly lines (the second manufacturer to adopt them—Ransom Olds was first), and in 1903 he sold 1,350 Ramblers. By 1905, Jeffery more than doubled this number. One reason may have been because he went to the steering wheel before 1904. In 1907, he was building a large variety of different body styles and sizes. Among them was a five-passenger, $2,500 Rambler weighing 2,600 pounds and powered by a 40-hp engine.

Jeffery died in 1910 while on holiday in Pompeii, in Italy, and after his death his son Charles T. Jeffery changed the automotive branding from Rambler to Jeffery in the founder's honor.

In 1916, Jeffery's family sold the manufacturing business to Charles W. Nash, who renamed the company Nash Motors and greatly expanded its manufacturing.

Monopoly fighter 
Jeffrey contested several patents:

 Fought the Pope bicycle patent and won.
 Fought the Selden bicycle patent and won.

Timeline 

 1878 – Jeffery partners with Phillip Gormally and starts the Gormally & Jeffery Bicycling Manufacturing Company in Chicago, Illinois.
 1892 – Jeffery invents the "Clincher Tire".
 1897 – Jeffery's builds a rear-engine Rambler prototype using the Rambler name previously used on a highly successful line of bicycles made by G&J.
 1899 – Positive reviews at the 1899 Chicago International Exhibition & Tournament and the first National Automobile Show in New York prompt the Jefferys to enter the automobile business.
 1900 – Jeffery sells his stake in G&J to the American Bicycle Company.
 1900 (Dec 6) – Thomas B. Jeffery finalizes a $65,000 deal to buy the Kenosha, factory of the defunct Sterling Bicycle Co. with money from the sale of his interest in the G&J.
 1901 – Two more prototypes, Models A and B, are made.
 1902 – First production Ramblers – the $750 Model C open runabout and the $850 Model D (the same car with a folding top). Both are powered by an 8-hp, 98cu. in., 1-cyl. engine mounted beneath the seat, and both are steered by a pioneering right-side tiller (a new concept at the time). First-year production totals 1,500 units making Jeffery the second-largest car maker behind Oldsmobile.
 1910 (Mar 21) – Thomas B. Jeffery dies while on vacation in Pompeii, Italy.
 1910 (Jun 10) – Charles T. Jeffery incorporates the family's car business as a $3 million public stock company.
 1914 – Charles T. Jeffery replaces the Rambler name with the Jeffery moniker in honor of Thomas B. Jeffery.
 1915 – Charles T. Jeffery survives the sinking of the RMS Lusitania off the Irish coast

References

External links 
Rambler bicycle advertisement
"Who Was Thomas B. Jeffery?" page by the Jeffery Elementary School, Kenosha, WI, retrieved on: July 31, 2007.
1916 Kenosha article retrieved on: July 31, 2007.

1845 births
1910 deaths
American inventors
American Motors people
Chrysler people
American automotive pioneers
American chief executives in the automobile industry
Engineers from Plymouth, Devon
People from Kenosha, Wisconsin
Businesspeople from Chicago
Businesspeople from Wisconsin
American founders of automobile manufacturers
19th-century American businesspeople